The Mayor of Charlottesville is the president of the City Council in Charlottesville, Virginia.  Before 1888, Charlottesville was a town within Albemarle County, Virginia, and the electorate directly chose a mayor in regular elections. In 1888, Charlottesville incorporated as a city independent of the county but continued to select its mayors in the same fashion. Since 1922, however, the popular electorate has chosen a number of individuals to serve on city council - initially three, then five from 1928 to the present.  From 1922 through 2006 those elections took place in May or June each even-numbered year.  Beginning in 2007, council elections moved to November of odd-numbered years.  The elected councilors chose one of their own members to serve as leader of the council with the title of "mayor" but with no distinct legal or executive authority. The mayor presides over council meetings and occasionally plays a role as the ceremonial head of city government.

List of mayors

Popularly elected mayors (1853–1922)
(partial list)

City Council chosen mayors (1922–present)

Notes

Further reading
Lisa Provence, "Mayorsville: Here, everybody's a mayor", The Hook, August 10, 2006
Cvillepedia:  Mayor of Charlottesville since 1922

Charlottesville, Virginia
Charlottesville, Virginia
List